Bathytoma neocaledonica is a species of sea snail, a marine gastropod mollusk in the family Borsoniidae.

Distribution
This marine species occurs in the Southwestern Pacific off New Caledonia.

Description
The height of this species varies between 40 mm and 44 mm.

References

 Puillandre N., Sysoev A.V., Olivera B.M., Couloux A. & Bouchet P. (2010) Loss of planktotrophy and speciation: geographical fragmentation in the deep-water gastropod genus Bathytoma (Gastropoda, Conoidea) in the western Pacific. Systematics and Biodiversity 8(3): 371-394

External links
 Gastropods.com: Bathytoma neocaledonica

neocaledonica
Gastropods described in 2010